Mark Joseph Renaud (born February 21, 1959) is a Canadian former professional ice hockey defenceman.  He was drafted in the fifth round, 102nd overall, by the Hartford Whalers in the 1979 NHL Entry Draft.  He played in the National Hockey League with Hartford and the Buffalo Sabres.

Renaud was born in Windsor, Ontario. In his NHL career, Renaud appeared in 152 games scoring six goals and adding 50 assists.

Mark's son Mickey (1988-2008), was the captain of the OHL's Windsor Spitfires and a Calgary Flames draft pick in the 2007 NHL Entry Draft. Since 2009, the OHL has presented a yearly award to the OHL captain who best exemplifies the qualities of leadership and work ethic while having fun in the game of hockey, that Mickey possessed.

Career statistics

Regular season and playoffs

External links

1959 births
Living people
Binghamton Whalers players
Buffalo Sabres players
Canadian ice hockey defencemen
Hartford Whalers draft picks
Hartford Whalers players
Ice hockey people from Ontario
Niagara Falls Flyers players
Rochester Americans players
Sportspeople from Windsor, Ontario
Springfield Indians players
Windsor Spitfires players